Julius Nyerere University of Kankan (UJNK), also known as Université de Kankan is a university in Kankan, Guinea. It is named after Julius Nyerere, the first President of Tanzania.

History
The university was established in 1968 after the Julis Nyerere Normal School that preceded it was turned into a national university in affiliation with the Gamal Abdel Nasser University in Conakry. Alumni include the writer Mariama Kesso Diallo.

See also
List of buildings and structures in Guinea

References

External links
Official site

Kankan
Universities in Guinea
U
Educational institutions established in 1968
1968 establishments in Guinea